A referendum on the prohibition of alcohol was held in Iceland on 10 September 1908, alongside parliamentary elections. In the first referendum to be held in the country, voters were asked whether they approved of a ban on importing alcohol. It was approved by 60.1% of voters but was overturned by a second referendum in 1933.

Results

References

Referendums in Iceland
Prohibition referendums
1908 referendums
1908 in Iceland
Alcohol in Iceland
September 1908 events